Testosterone hexyloxyphenylpropionate (brand name Andradurin) is an androgen and anabolic steroid and a testosterone ester.

References

Androgens and anabolic steroids
Androstanes
Testosterone esters